The 1944 VFL Grand Final was an Australian rules football game contested between the Fitzroy Football Club and Richmond Football Club, held at the Junction Oval in Melbourne on 30 September 1944. It was the 46th annual grand final of the Victorian Football League, staged to determine the premiers for the 1944 VFL season. The match was won by Fitzroy by a margin of 15 points, marking that club's first premiership since 1922, and its eighth (and final) premiership and final grand final appearance. The match attracted 41,000 spectators, down on expectations owing in part to a one-day tram strike.

This was the last grand final to have two captain-coaches playing against each other.. The 1944 Grand Final was Fitzroy's last premiership before they merged with the Brisbane Bears in 1997 to become the Brisbane Lions, who won the premiership in 2001.

Teams

 Umpire - Eric Hawkins

Statistics

Goalkickers

See also
 1944 VFL season

References

AFL Tables: 1944 Grand Final

External links
Games you may have missed: State Library of Victoria Australian Rules research guide

VFL/AFL Grand Finals
Grand
Fitzroy Football Club
Richmond Football Club
September 1944 sports events